is the fourth studio album by Ikimonogakari, released in Japan on December 23, 2009. A limited edition version included a bonus DVD with footage from their concert "Ikimono Gakari no Minasan, Konni Tour!! 2009 - My song Your song -" performance on May 25, 2009 at Shibuya C.C. Lemon Hall, plus special booklet, and ikimono card 017.

Track list

Oricon Chart (Japan)

Notes

References

Awards and nominations

Japan Record Awards

The Japan Record Awards is a major music awards show held annually in Japan by the Japan Composer's Association.

|-
| 2010
| Hajimari no Uta
| Best Album Award
|

External links
 

2009 albums
Ikimono-gakari albums